Cynosa is a genus of spiders in the family Lycosidae. It was first described in 1933 by Caporiacco. , it contains only one species, Cynosa agedabiae, found in North Africa.

References

Lycosidae
Monotypic Araneomorphae genera
Spiders of Africa